Amanita rimosa is a species of agaric fungus in the family Amanitaceae native to Hunan, first described by P. Zhang & Zhu L. Yang in 2010. Like other Phalloideae amanitas, it is lethally toxic. A distinctive feature of A. rimosa is its rimose pileus, caused by slightly gelatinized upper layer of the pileipellis, which is a rare structure among other Amanita species.

External links

References 

rimosa
Fungi of Asia
Fungi described in 2010
Deadly fungi